The James B. Macelwane Medal is awarded annually by the American Geophysical Union to three to five early career scientists (no more than 10 years beyond having received their Ph.D.). It is named after James B. Macelwane, a Jesuit priest and one of the pioneers of seismology. The medal is regarded as the highest honor for young scientists in the field of Geological and Planetary Sciences. In 1984, Mary Hudson became the first woman to receive the award.

Medal recipients
Source: AGU

See also
 List of geophysicists
 List of geophysics awards
 List of prizes named after people

References

American Geophysical Union awards
Awards established in 1961